Diran may refer to:

Places
Diran bagrote valley gilgit, a mountain in Pakistan
Diran, Iran, a village in Zanjan Province, Iran

Persons
Given name
Diran, a given name in Western Armenian; the Eastern Armenian equivalent is Tiran
Diran of Armenia, an Armenian King (339-350)
Diran Adebayo (born 1968), British novelist, cultural critic and broadcaster
Diran Alexanian (1881–1954), French Armenian cello teacher and musician
Diran Chrakian (1875-1921), Armenian poet, writer, painter and teacher who was a victim of the Armenian Genocide
Diran Kelekian (1862-1915), Ottoman Armenian journalist, writer, editor and professor who was an Armenian Genocide victim
Diran Manoukian (born 1919), French Armenian field hockey player 

Family name
Richard K. Diran (born 1949), American gemologist

Armenian masculine given names